The Taiwan Chi Yuan Culture Foundation (Chinese: 台灣棋院文化基金會  Pinyin:Táiwān Qíyuàn Wénhuà Jījīnhuì ), also known as the Taiwan Chi Yuan or Taiwan Go Association, is a professional Go association in Taiwan. The Taiwan Qiyuan was created on March 4, 2000 with initial funding provided by Mr. Weng Ming Xian (Chinese:翁明顯 Pinyin: Wēng Míng Xiǎn) who also served as the first chairman of the association. The chairman is Chen Guoxing. It ranks professionals and runs professional qualification exams for players in Taiwan.

See also 

 International Go Federation
 List of professional Go tournaments
 Nihon Ki-in
 Kansai Ki-in
 Hanguk Kiwon
 Zhongguo Qiyuan
 Hoensha

External links
 Official website of Taiwan Chi Yuan

Go organizations